Mukhino is a rural locality (a village) in Sidorovskoye Rural Settlement, Gryazovetsky District, Vologda Oblast, Russia. The population was 11 as of 2002.

Geography 
Mukhino is located 46 km east of Gryazovets (the district's administrative centre) by road. Kolotilikha is the nearest rural locality.

References 

Rural localities in Gryazovetsky District